The Boston University Terriers men's lacrosse team represents Boston University in National Collegiate Athletic Association (NCAA) Division I college lacrosse. The program was created in 2014. Boston U plays its home games at Nickerson Field, which has a capacity of 9,871. The Terriers have competed in the Patriot League since their 2014 founding. Through 2020, the team has an all–time record of 50–50.

In the team's inaugural season, Boston U scored its first-ever program victory with a 13 to 5 defeat of the Lafayette Leopards. In the program's short history, the Terriers defeated their first ranked foes in route to a 12–5 record in 2017, their best to date. During that campaign, the team upset #17 Navy 8–7 in Annapolis, Maryland, before topping the #19 Loyola Greyhounds 12–11 in an overtime showdown. The victory over the Greyhounds clinched the program's first berth in a Patriot League postseason game and first national ranking. However, a difficult defeat at the hands of Army in the semifinals of the Patriot League tournament denied the Terriers a shot at their first NCAA Division I Men's Lacrosse Championship appearance. In 2019, the Terriers again upset Loyola, ranked #2, in a resounding 7 point victory for the highest ranked victory in team history. The victory propelled Boston U to their third consecutive appearance in the Patriot League tournament. Additionally, sophomore attacker Chris Gray gained a 2019 Tewaaraton Award nomination and gained second-team All-American honors after the campaign, prior to his transfer to North Carolina.

Season Results
The following is a list of Boston U's results by season:

{| class="wikitable"

|- align="center"

†NCAA canceled 2020 collegiate activities due to the COVID-19 virus.

References

External links
 

College men's lacrosse teams in the United States
Patriot League men's lacrosse
2014 establishments in Massachusetts
Lacrosse clubs established in 2014